PureGym Limited is a British chain of no frills health clubs based in the United Kingdom with multiple gyms around the world. The chain is headquartered in Leeds, West Yorkshire, with additional offices in London and Southampton.

It is Britain's largest gym chain by membership, with over 1,500,000 members registered to their gyms.

In May 2015, PureGym acquired all gyms from rival UK fitness chain LA Fitness, bringing the total number of gyms across the UK to 141. As of October 2022, PureGym had 327 gyms in the UK, with more than 1.5 million members, making it the largest operator of gyms across the United Kingdom.
PureGym operate gyms across 9 different countries and have over 500 locations worldwide, with the newest territory, UAE opened in 2022.

Facilities
Most locations are open 24 hours a day and offer cardio equipment, fixed and free weights, and exercise classes, there are over 200 pieces of training equipment in most gyms. There are no swimming pools or saunas, which are found in more expensive gyms.

All PureGyms are monitored by real-time TV linked directly to security staff and emergency services. Most gyms also run weekly fire drills during off-peak hours.

Ownership and management
PureGym was privately owned by CCMP Capital and other investors. In 2014, rival The Gym Group attempted to take over Pure Gym, but abandoned the takeover after it was referred to the Competition and Markets Authority.

In May 2015, PureGym Ltd bought their UK rival LA Fitness for around £60 million to £80 million.

Humphrey Cobbold took over from Peter Roberts as the CEO. Roberts has, in turn, become the CFO, with Adam Bellamy continuing as the Non-Executive Director.

In November 2017 it was bought by Los Angeles-based Leonard Green & Partners for £600 million.

In December 2019 PureGym agreed to buy Danish Fitness World, which also operated in Switzerland and Poland, for £350 million.

In February 2021 Humphrey Cobbold told the BBC that  "We are burning about £500,000 a day and that's the average over eight months of closure"

In 2019, PureGym acquired the Swiss basefit.ch. By the end of 2021, all of their facilities will have been renamed and redesigned

It has a 2-star accreditation from Best Companies and a BCI score of 696.6.

PureGym opened in Dubai in 2022. PureGym UAE is headed up by CEO Susan Turner, with operations being handled by John Foy.

References

External links

PureGym

Health clubs in the United Kingdom
Companies based in Leeds
British companies established in 2009
2009 establishments in England